José Inés Palafox Núñez (14 September 1960 – 6 July 2018) is a Mexican politician from the National Action Party. From 2006 to 2009 he served as Deputy of the LX Legislature of the Mexican Congress representing Sonora.

Born in Zacatecas, he moved to San Luis Río Colorado as a child. He served as a local deputy in the LV Legislature of the Congress of Sonora from 1997 to 2000 before becoming municipal president of San Luis Río Colorado.

References

1960 births
2018 deaths
Members of the Congress of Sonora
Municipal presidents in Sonora
National Action Party (Mexico) politicians
20th-century Mexican politicians
21st-century Mexican politicians
Mexican civil engineers
Politicians from Zacatecas
Politicians from Sonora
People from San Luis Río Colorado
Members of the Chamber of Deputies (Mexico) for Sonora